Live in Trondheim, Berlin & Limoges, Vol. 2 is a 1994 live album of improvised experimental music by Chris Cutler and Fred Frith. It was recorded in Limoges, France on 13 December 1979; at the Nordlydd Contemporary Music Festival in Trondheim, Norway on 16 October 1991; and in Tacheles, Berlin, Germany on 2 November 1991. The album was released by Recommended Records in 1994. It was Frith and Cutler's second collaborative album.

The Limoges recording was originally released as "Limoges" on a limited edition 7-inch single in 1983 and given to subscribers of Frith and Cutler's first collaborative album, Live in Prague and Washington (1983).

Reception

In a review at AllMusic, Rick Anderson described Live in Trondheim, Berlin & Limoges, Vol. 2 as "arrythmic ... without anything approaching melody", but "never unapproachable". He added that there is "something sweet-natured" about the "weird, sumptuous and virtuosic noise" Cutler and Frith make, and felt that even listeners not partial to noise music should have no trouble appreciating the "textural complexity" of their "endless inventiveness".

Track listing
All music by Chris Cutler and Fred Frith.

Sources: Liner notes, Discogs, Fred Frith discography.

Personnel
Chris Cutler – drums, electrics, flotsam
Fred Frith – guitar, bass guitar, violin ("Meltdown"), jetsam

Sources: Liner notes, Discogs, Fred Frith discography.

Sound and artwork
Trondheim concert recorded by Bjørn Olav Sjøholt
Berlin concert recorded by Rainer Robben
Limoges concert recorded by James Dupron
Edited and mastered by Chris Cutler and Dominique Brethes in London, May 1994
"Meltdown" edited by Steve Rickard
"Meltdown" mastered by Bill Sharp at DYS in Denver, Colorado
CD cover, artwork, and photography by Chris Cutler

Sources: Liner notes, Discogs, Fred Frith discography.

Notes

References

1994 live albums
Collaborative albums
Experimental music albums by English artists
Live free improvisation albums
Fred Frith live albums
Chris Cutler live albums
Recommended Records live albums